Meljean Brook is an American author known for her paranormal and steampunk romance series. She also publishes under the pseudonym Milla Vane and designs cover art for herself and fellow writers.  She is represented by Nephele Tempest at The Knight Agency.

Biography
Meljean Brook was born in Dallas, Oregon and currently resides in Portland, Oregon with her family. Brook graduated from Portland State University with a bachelor's degree in English.

Brook sold her first novella after being contacted by editor Cindy Hwang when she was at Berkley Publishing Group, who read and enjoyed Brook's fanfic.

Bibliography

As Meljean Brook

The Guardian Series

The Iron Seas Series
In this alternative history, steampunk series, the Mongol Empire conquered Eurasia and Africa with war machine and nanotechnology. England is freed from their control by the actions of the Iron Duke.

The Kraken King Series 

 The Kraken King - Part One (Nov 2014)
 The Kraken King - Part Two
 The Kraken King - Part Three
 The Kraken King - Part Four
 The Kraken King - Part Five
 The Kraken King - Part Six
 The Kraken King - Part Seven
 The Kraken King - Part Eight

Other works 

Legends of Red Sonja - Issue #2 (Dec 2013) UPC 725130209290 00211 also in  Legends of Red Sonja - Collection Edition
Frozen (Sep 2014)

As Milla Vane

A Gathering of Dragons series
0.5 The Beast of Blackmoor (prequel novella) (Nov 2014) in Night Shift
A Heart of Blood and Ashes  (Feb 2020)
A Touch of Stone and Snow  (July 2020)
A Dance of Smoke and Steel  (2022)

Anthologies and collections

References or sources

External links

Official blog
Facebook Page
Twitter Account
Milla Vane website

Living people
American women novelists
Writers from Portland, Oregon
American romantic fiction writers
21st-century American women writers
21st-century American novelists
Women romantic fiction writers
People from Dallas, Oregon
Portland State University alumni
Year of birth missing (living people)
Novelists from Oregon